Tingyu Fang (born 1935 in Shanghai) is a Chinese professor of English. He graduated from the Beijing University of Foreign Studies in 1957.

Career 
Fang has taught medical English in Beijing University for the study of Chinese medicine. Fang was the former Director of the Foreign Language Department of Beijing University of Chinese Medicine, a member of the 9th and 10th National Committee of the Chinese People’s Political Consultative Conference, former Vice-chairman of the Harvard Beijing Club European and American students association, President of the Harvard Alumni Association in Beijing, current professor of Beijing University of traditional Chinese medicine, English communication and Director of the Center, Chief Adviser of the Chinese Association of Chinese medicine of traditional Chinese medicine translation Panel, Vice President of Professional Committee of World Federation of Chinese Medicine Translation, Ministry of health for foreign students in bilingual teaching material of Chinese Medicine Editorial Board of advisers.

Since 1993, Fang has been a member of the CPPCC Chaoyang District, Beijing and he has also served as a member of the National Committee (ninth, tenth CPPCC member) since 1998. In 2008, Fang was invited to serve as the head of the translation group in WHO Congress.

Sources
 Bin Hu, http://zhongyi.Sina.com/news/jkkx/20117/67482.shtml, SINA news, updated July 21, 2011 (in Chinese)
 Vicker, http://www.hudong.com/wiki/%E6%96%B9%E5%BB%B7%E9%92%B0,2009 update on December 23 (in Chinese)
 Junjie Chen, http://news.Sina.com.CN/c/2006-02-27/05599209207.shtml, SINA news, updated February 27, 2006 (in Chinese)
 Wenying Xie, Wei Wei, http://www.JCRB.com/N1/jcrb1492/ca658722.htm, check daily, updated December 3, 2007 (in Chinese)
 Ying Zhang, http://www.infzm.com/content/27743, southern weekly, April 29, 2009 update (in Chinese)
 Wei Ku, http://business.Sohu.com/20090109/n261662682.shtml, Sohu finance, transferred from the people's network, updated January 9, 2009 (in Chinese)
 WorldCat, http://www.WorldCat.org/wcidentities/LCCN-n86-128897, column published works (in English)
 yuyu, http://www.zhongyiyao.net/bbs/thread-44464-1-1.html,updated October 27, 2011(in Chinese)

External links
 Beijing Digital Museum of traditional Chinese medicine, http://www.TCM-China.info
 WorldCat libraries, http://www.WorldCat.org/wcidentities/LCCN-n86-128897

Beijing Foreign Studies University alumni
Academic staff of Peking University
Academic staff of Beijing University of Chinese Medicine
Traditional Chinese medicine